The 1964 Iowa gubernatorial election was held on November 3, 1964. Incumbent Democrat Harold Hughes defeated Republican nominee Evan Hultman with 68.05% of the vote.

Primary elections
Primary elections were held on June 1, 1964.

Democratic primary

Candidates
Harold Hughes, incumbent Governor

Results

Republican primary

Candidates
Evan Hultman, Attorney General of Iowa

Results

General election

Candidates
Major party candidates
Harold Hughes, Democratic 
Evan Hultman, Republican

Other candidates
Robert D. Dilley, Independent

Results

References

1964
Iowa
Gubernatorial